These are the Blues is a 1963 studio album by the American jazz singer Ella Fitzgerald featuring trumpeter Roy Eldridge and organist Wild Bill Davis. Sleeve artwork was painted by David Stone Martin. This is Fitzgerald's only example of recording an entire album of blues songs.

Track listing
For the 1963 Verve LP release; Verve V6-4060; Re-issued in 1990 on CD, Verve 829 536-2

Side One:
 "Jailhouse Blues" (Bessie Smith, Clarence Williams)  – 5:25
 "In the Evening (When the Sun Goes Down)" (Leroy Carr, Don Raye)  – 4:27
 "See See Rider" (Ma Rainey)  – 2:39
 "You Don't Know My Mind"  (Gray, Virginia Liston, Williams)  – 4:49
 "Trouble in Mind" (Richard M. Jones)  – 3:31
Side Two:
 "How Long, How Long Blues" (Leroy Carr) – 3:57
 "Cherry Red" (Pete Johnson, Big Joe Turner) – 4:09
 "Downhearted Blues" (Lovie Austin, Alberta Hunter)  – 3:08
 "St. Louis Blues" (W. C. Handy) – 6:28
 "Hear Me Talkin' to Ya" (Louis Armstrong) – 3:01

Personnel
 Ella Fitzgerald - vocals
 Roy Eldridge - trumpet
 Wild Bill Davis - electronic organ
 Herb Ellis - guitar
 Ray Brown - double bass
 Gus Johnson - drums

References

1963 albums
Ella Fitzgerald albums
Albums produced by Norman Granz
Albums with cover art by David Stone Martin
Blues albums by American artists
Verve Records albums